Senior Adviser to the President is a title used by highest-ranking advisers to the President of Sri Lanka. Senior Presidential Advisers are attached to but are not part of the Presidential Secretariat. The title has been used formally since 1990's to differentiate from other Presidential Advisers and Coordinating Secretaries.

Responsibilities
Over time, Senior Advisers have been appointed to advice the president on following areas:

 Political Affairs
 International Affairs
 Economic Affairs 
 Legal and Constitutional Affairs 
 National Security

Remuneration
As of 2015, a Presidential Adviser were paid a salary of Rs 75,000 which was supplemented by an allowance of one third of their salary. In addition, an adviser is issued with a mobile phone, a laptop and a fully maintained vehicle as well as 200 liters of fuel which was increased based on their outstation travel. While mobile and residential phone bills are partially paid by the Presidential Secretariat.

List of Senior Advisers to the President
 D. M. Jayaratne 
 Ratnasiri Wickremanayake
 Milinda Moragoda
 K. Balapatabendi
 Bradman Weerakoon
 Ravi Jayewardene
 Harry Jayawardena
Lalith Weerathunga

See also
 Presidential Adviser
 Senior Advisor to the President of the United States
 Special adviser (UK)
 Senior Advisor

References